Penne Nee Vaazhga is a 1967 Indian Tamil-language film produced and directed by P. Madhavan, starring Jaishankar and K. R. Vijaya. It was released on 14 January 1967 and emerged a success. The film was remade in Malayalam as Brahmachari (1972).

Plot

Cast 
 Jaishankar
 K. R. Vijaya
 Nagesh
 K. A. Thangavelu

Soundtrack 
The music was composed by K. V. Mahadevan, with lyrics by Vaali.

Release and reception 
Penne Nee Vaazhga was released on 14 January 1967, during Pongal. Despite facing competition from other Pongal releases, including Thaikku Thalaimagan, Kandhan Karunai and Pattathu Rani, it became a success. Kalki lauded the film for Vijaya's performance and the innovative story.

References

External links 
 

1960s Tamil-language films
Films directed by P. Madhavan
Films scored by K. V. Mahadevan
Tamil films remade in other languages